Arthur Plant may refer to:

Bob Plant (Arthur Blurton Plant; 1915–2011), British Army officer during World War II
Arthur (plant), a running gag in Mad magazine

See also
Arthur Plante (1869–1927), Quebec lawyer and political figure